Khayrobod may refer to the following places in Tajikistan:

Khayrobod, Ayni District, a village in Ayni District, Sughd Region
Khayrobod, Kuhistoni Mastchoh District, a village in Kuhistoni Mastchoh District, Sughd Region

See also
Khairabad (disambiguation)
Kheyrabad (disambiguation)